Michel Nieva (born 1988) is an Argentine writer. He was born in Buenos Aires. He has written several books, among them the poetry collection Papelera de reciclaje, novels such as ¿Sueñan los gauchoides con ñandúes eléctricos? and Ascenso y apogeo del imperio argentino, and essays compiled in the volume Tecnología y barbarie. His prose work often deals with science fiction and speculative genres. He is also a teacher and translator.

In 2021, he was named by Granta magazine as one of the best young writers in the Spanish language.

References

Argentine writers
1988 births
Living people